Dhulappa Bhaurao Navale (15 January 1910 – 30 September 1988) was an Indian freedom fighter. He was born in a Chaturtha Digambar Jain family at Ankalkhop. Navale lost his father and his elder brother in his childhood. He completed his education till matriculation. After completing school he started social work in Ankalkhop and surrounding villages.

See also
 Chaturtha
 History of Maharashtra
 List of Jains

References

1910 births
1988 deaths
Members of the Maharashtra Legislative Council
Marathi politicians